José Antonio Chang Escobedo (born 19 May 1958) is a Peruvian politician of Chinese descent who was the Prime Minister of Peru from 2010 to 2011, appointed by President Alan García. He was also Minister of Education until he resigned both cabinet positions on March 18, 2011.
Chang replaced Javier Velásquez as part of a cabinet reshuffle. Chang was the second Chinese-Peruvian Prime Minister, the first being Víctor Joy Way in 1999 during the administration of President Alberto Fujimori. He currently serves as a Rector of the University of San Martín de Porres.

Education 
Chang Escobedo studied in Lima, at the Great Melitón Carvajal School Unit. He entered and graduated from the Federico Villarreal National University with a degree in industrial engineering, and obtained a Master of Education degree in the specialty of Educational Computing and Technology from the University of Hartford, Connecticut, in the United States of America. He has also studied Administration and Organization at ESAN.

University of San Martín de Porres 
José Antonio Chang Escobedo was the first dean of the Faculty of Computer Engineering and Systems of the University of San Martín de Porres, considering him the manager of the transformation of said faculty and later of the university of which he was rector from 1996, until he requested leave in 2006 to occupy the position of Minister of Education. During his tenure, the USMP began an infrastructure renovation program that has allowed it to have modern campuses equipped with state-of-the-art technology in all its specialties. In 2001, an investigative sub-commission of the Congress of the Republic that analyzed the complaints of irregularities in said university, recommended that they be renewed to the authorities. Since then, 14 years have passed and José Antonio Chang continues to lead the San Martín University, which in 2012 reported total income of S / .372 million. On the other hand, under his leadership, international accreditation processes were initiated in all the university's faculties and schools, which has allowed 16 professional careers, 31 master's degrees and 6 doctorates offered by the university to have international accreditations at the beginning of 2012. He was re-elected for the third time as rector of said house of studies in 2011. Previously: 1996, 2001, 2006, and lately, 2011.

References

1958 births
Living people
American Popular Revolutionary Alliance politicians
Prime Ministers of Peru
Recipients of the Order of the Sun of Peru
Peruvian politicians of Chinese descent
University of Hartford alumni
People from Lima
Federico Villarreal National University alumni
Academic staff of the University of San Martín de Porres